The Shelton Brothers, Bob, Joe and Merle, were pioneer country musicians and renowned recording artists based out of Texas from the mid-1930s through the 1960s. They created and popularized the songs  Johnson's Old Gray Mule, Deep Elm  Blues, These Shoes Are Killing Me,  Oh Monah, Match Box Blues and My Heart Oozes Blood For You, "What's The Matter With Deep Elm", "I'm A Handy Man To Have Around" and "Henpecked Husband Blues". The Shelton Brothers (Joe and Bob) also wrote (their names appear as co-writers, but the writer was actually, individually, Sydney Robin) and were the second to record "Just Because" (Decca 46008), a song that has since been recorded numerous times by various artists including Elvis Presley who included it on his very first album titled "Elvis Presley". The original recording was by Nelstone's Hawaiians, comprising Hubert Nelson and James D. Touchstone. The song's opening line reads: Just because you think you're so pretty, just because you think you're so hot..... "Just Because" was the Shelton's first release on Decca but, due to their popularity, they went on to cut over 150 sides for the label. They also recorded sides for Victor Records and King Records. The Shelton Brothers would become one of the most successful country acts of the era.

The Shelton Brothers was also one of the earliest acts to appear on the famous Big D Jamboree which originated from the Dallas Sportatorium in Dallas, Texas. They later became an integral part of The Saturday Night Shindig which also originated from Dallas.

Discography

References
Elvis Presley Sun recordings
 Big D Jamboree Performers
Louisiana Hayride Performers
1935 Top Country Music Hits

Sources
Shelton Brothers Biography
Songs That Elvis Loved-Aura Lee by Shelton Brothers

External links
[ Allmusic biography]
 The Shelton Brothers recordings at the Discography of American Historical Recordings.

Decca Records artists
King Records artists
RCA Victor artists
Vocal trios
Musical groups from Dallas
People from Dallas
People from Duncanville, Texas